Muriceopsis is a genus of gorgonian-type, branching colonial octocorals in the family Plexauridae. They are found on shallow water reefs and are capable of developing sweeper tentacles. The growth of these corals is rapid and they can be kept in a reef aquarium.

Species
The World Register of Marine Species lists the following species:

Muriceopsis bayeriana Sánchez, 2007
Muriceopsis flavida (Lamarck, 1815)
Muriceopsis metaclados Castro, Medeiros & Loiola, 2010
Muriceopsis petila Bayer, 1961
Muriceopsis sulphurea (Donovan, 1825)
Muriceopsis tuberculata (Esper, 1792)

References

Plexauridae
Octocorallia genera